Brafferton is a village and former civil parish, now in the parish of Brafferton and Helperby, in the Hambleton District of North Yorkshire, England. According to the 2001 census it had a population of 257, increasing to 311 at the 2011 Census. On 1 April 2019 the parish was merged with Helperby to form Brafferton and Helperby.

The village is situated about ten miles south of Thirsk, on the River Swale. It is contiguous with the village of Helperby, one street has properties in one village on one side and the other opposite. The village takes its name from a ford across the Swale, it being originally Broad-Ford-Town, and now by contraction, Brafferton.

The parish church of St Peter's was built in the 15th century, modified in 1826 by the architect James Pritchett and restored in 1878. It is a grade II* listed building. An unusual feature of the church is that the battlemented nave is wider than it is long. On the outside wall of the chancel are carved the arms of the Neville family.  Underneath is the Latin inscription: "orate pro animo Radulphi Neville fundatoris hujus Ecclesioe - soi deo honor et gloria!" (Pray for the soul of Ralph Neville, founder of this Church- To God the honour and glory). On the largest bell is inscribed "Radulphus Neville Armiger, I.H.S. 1598".

Norman M‘Neile, known as “the blind vicar”, served at St Peter's for 50 years. He was completely blind from the age of 12.

History
Ralph Rymer, Lord of the Manor at the Restoration, was executed in 1664 for his part in the Farnley Wood Plot of 1663. His lands reverted to the Crown. His son was the author, critic and Historiographer Royal, Thomas Rymer.

References

External links

Villages in North Yorkshire
Former civil parishes in North Yorkshire
Hambleton District